Ken Grossman (born November 11, 1954) is an American billionaire businessman, founder of Sierra Nevada Brewing Company.

Early life
Grossman was born to a Jewish family in southern California on November 11, 1954. He studied at Butte College and California State University, Chico.

Career
In 1978, Grossman founded Sierra Nevada Brewing Company in Chico, California with Paul Camusi. In 1998, he bought out Camusi.

Personal life
Grossman and his wife Katie (née Gonser) have three children and live in Chico, California. His son Brian and daughter Sierra will run the company when he retires. His son Brian moved to North Carolina to manage the new Sierra Nevada Brewery in Mills River, North Carolina which began production in 2014.  His wife Katie is a teetotaler.

References

1954 births
Living people
American billionaires
20th-century American Jews
American brewers
21st-century American Jews